Ousmane N'Gom Camara (born 26 May 1975) is a Guinean former professional footballer who played as a wide midfielder.

Club career
Camara was born in Conakry. He joined Belgian club K. Londerzeel S.K. in 2008.

International career
Camara was part of the Guinea national team at the 2004 African Nations Cup team, which finished second of its group in the first round of competition, before losing in the quarter finals to Mali.

References

External links
 

1975 births
Living people
Guinean footballers
Association football midfielders
Guinea international footballers
1994 African Cup of Nations players
1998 African Cup of Nations players
2004 African Cup of Nations players
Belgian Pro League players
Challenger Pro League players
Süper Lig players
AS Kaloum Star players
Royal Excel Mouscron players
K.S.V. Waregem players
K.V. Mechelen players
Konyaspor footballers
Ethnikos Asteras F.C. players
Guinean expatriate footballers
Guinean expatriate sportspeople in Greece
Expatriate footballers in Greece
Guinean expatriate sportspeople in Belgium
Expatriate footballers in Belgium
Guinean expatriate sportspeople in Turkey
Expatriate footballers in Turkey